Nikolai Goc (born June 17, 1986) is a German professional ice hockey defenceman who is currently playing with the Bietigheim Steelers in the DEL2. He previously played with Adler Mannheim in the Deutsche Eishockey Liga (DEL). He participated at the 2010 IIHF World Championship as a member of the German National men's ice hockey team.

He has played alongside, former veteran NHL player and brother Marcel during his tenure in Mannheim while also a teammate with his other older brother Sascha, during his time with the Schwenninger Wild Wings.

On July 26, 2018, Goc accepted a one-year contract to add a veteran presence to the Bietigheim Steelers of the DEL2.

Career statistics

Regular season and playoffs

International

References

External links

1986 births
Living people
Adler Mannheim players
German ice hockey defencemen
Hannover Scorpions players
Schwenninger Wild Wings players
People from Calw
Sportspeople from Karlsruhe (region)
German people of Czech descent
SC Bietigheim-Bissingen players
Fischtown Pinguins players